Christos Charalabous (born October 3, 1981, in Limassol) was a Cypriot football player. He became Assistant Manager of Dusan Kerkez in AEL Limassol from 2018.

External links
 

1981 births
Living people
Cypriot footballers
AEL Limassol players
Xanthi F.C. players
Panthrakikos F.C. players
Aris Limassol FC players
Cypriot First Division players
Super League Greece players
Cypriot expatriate footballers
Expatriate footballers in Greece
Association football midfielders
Sportspeople from Limassol